Dato' Ng Boon Bee  (17 December 1937 – 3 August 2022) was a Malaysian badminton player who excelled from the 1960s through the early 1970s. His success in doubles earned him recognition as one of greatest doubles players in badminton history.

Early life
Boon Bee started to play badminton when he was ten years inspired by his badminton-playing father. His first success in badminton came in 1955 when he became Perak schoolboy champ in the singles and doubles. A year later, he won the Perak junior. He also excelled in all types of sports beside badminton such as athletics, tennis, rugby, and playing association football at the national level.  It was some time in 1961 that he finally decided to concentrate on badminton.

Career
During the 1960s, Boon Bee and his partner, Tan Yee Khan formed one of the most successful men's doubles teams of the decade, winning most of the sport's biggest titles including the coveted All England, Asian Games and Asian Championships. Known for his quickness, power, and anticipation, Boon Bee was a member of the Malaysian squad that won the 1967 Thomas Cup, in a 6–3 controversial victory over Indonesia at the Istora Senayan Stadium.

After Yee Khan retired in 1969, Boon Bee formed a successful partnership with Punch Gunalan. One of their biggest achievements was beating Indonesia's combination of Rudy Hartono/Indra Gunawan in the 1971 All-England final. There were other accomplishments too, including winning the 1970 Bangkok Asian Games and 1970 Commonwealth Games in Edinburgh.

Achievements

Olympic Games (demonstration) 
Men's doubles

Asian Games 
Men's doubles

Mixed doubles

Asian Championships 
Men's doubles

Southeast Asian Peninsular Games 
Men's doubles

Mixed doubles

Commonwealth Games 
Men's doubles

International tournaments 
Men's doubles

Mixed doubles

Awards
 1968 Malaysia's Sportsman of the Year
 He was inducted into the World Badminton Hall of Fame in 1998. 
 Olympic Council of Malaysia's (OCM) Hall of Fame 2015.

Honours 

  :
 Member of the Order of the Defender of the Realm (A.M.N.) (1972)
  :
 Knight Commander of the Grand Order of Tuanku Ja’afar (D.P.T.J.) – Dato' (2008)

Personal life and death
Boon Bee is the third child from five siblings. He was married to Tong Yee Cheng. Together they had 2 children – Gillian and Thomas. Thomas was named after the prestigious Thomas Cup.

On 3 August 2022, he died at the Raja Permaisuri Bainun Hospital due to aneurysm.

References

1937 births
2022 deaths
Malaysian sportspeople of Chinese descent
Malaysian male badminton players
People from Ipoh
Olympic badminton players of Malaysia
Badminton players at the 1972 Summer Olympics
Commonwealth Games medallists in badminton
Badminton players at the 1966 British Empire and Commonwealth Games
Badminton players at the 1970 British Commonwealth Games
Commonwealth Games gold medallists for Malaysia
Commonwealth Games silver medallists for Malaysia
Asian Games medalists in badminton
Badminton players at the 1962 Asian Games
Badminton players at the 1966 Asian Games
Badminton players at the 1970 Asian Games
Asian Games gold medalists for Malaysia
Asian Games silver medalists for Malaysia
Asian Games bronze medalists for Malaysia
Medalists at the 1962 Asian Games
Medalists at the 1966 Asian Games
Medalists at the 1970 Asian Games
Southeast Asian Games medalists in badminton
Southeast Asian Games gold medalists for Malaysia
Southeast Asian Games silver medalists for Malaysia
Members of the Order of the Defender of the Realm
Competitors at the 1961 Southeast Asian Peninsular Games
Medallists at the 1966 British Empire and Commonwealth Games
Medallists at the 1970 British Commonwealth Games